Thomas Oliver was a Tyneside poet/songwriter from the late eighteenth/early nineteenth century.

Details 

P. France & Co. in their 1850 book Songs of the Bards of the Tyne include three works “Canny Newcastle Again””, “Stream of a Thousand Fallen Adieu”, (both attributed to T. Oliver), and “Yon Orb is Sinking” (attributed to Thomas Oliver).

None of these three songs are written in the Geordie dialect, although they are written about Newcastle, Northumberland and North East England.

Nothing more appears to be known of this person, or his life or work.

See also 
 France's Songs of the Bards of the Tyne - 1850
 Joseph Philip Robson
 Geordie dialect words

External links
 Songs of the Bards of the Tyne

English male poets
People from Newcastle upon Tyne (district)
Musicians from Tyne and Wear
Geordie songwriters